The Journal of Child Neurology is a peer-reviewed medical journal that covers the field of pediatric neurology. The editor-in-chief is Marc C. Patterson (Mayo Clinic). The journal was established in 1986 and is published by SAGE Publications.

Abstracting and indexing 
The journal is abstracted and indexed in Scopus and the Science Citation Index Expanded. According to the Journal Citation Reports, its 2012 impact factor is 1.668.

References

External links 
 

SAGE Publishing academic journals
English-language journals
Monthly journals
Publications established in 1986
Neurology journals
Pediatrics journals